The 2021–22 Serie C was the eighth season of the unified Serie C division, the third tier of the Italian football league system.

Changes
The league is composed by 60 teams, divided into three different groups. On 31 May 2021, the league committee decreed the three groups would be split horizontally in geographical terms, from north to south. The group composition was decided and formalized by the committee on 9 August.

The following teams have changed division since the 2020–21 season:

To Serie C
Relegated from Serie B
 Reggiana
 Pescara
 Virtus Entella

Promoted from Serie D
 Seregno (Group B winners)
 Trento (Group C winners)
 Fiorenzuola (Group D winners)
 Montevarchi (Group E winners)
 Campobasso (Group F winners)
 Monterosi (Group G winners)
 Taranto (Group H winners)
 ACR Messina (Group I winners)
 Picerno (Group H play-off winners, admitted)
 Fidelis Andria (Group H 3rd place, repechage)
 Latina (Group G runners-up, repechage)
 Siena (Group E 5th place, repechage)

From Serie C
Promoted to Serie B
 Como (Group A winners)
 Perugia (Group B winners)
 Ternana (Group C winners)
 Alessandria (play-off winners)

Relegated to Serie D
 Novara (excluded)
 Livorno (subsequently disbanded)
 Sambenedettese (excluded)
 Carpi (excluded) 
 Fano
 Ravenna
 Arezzo
 Casertana (excluded) 
 Bisceglie
 Cavese
 Trapani (excluded and subsequently disbanded)

Vacancies 
On 6 July 2021, the Lega Pro football league announced Serie D Group A winners Gozzano had renounced on their promotion right, thus automatically creating a vacancy in the league.

On 9 July 2021, the Co.Vi.So.C. rejected league application of Carpi, Casertana, Novara, Paganese and Sambenedettese. All these clubs successively requested being admitted on appeal; in case that is denied, they would still have the opportunity for a further appeal at the Italian National Olympic Committee level. 
On 26 July 2021 the Italian National Olympic Committee admitted Paganese's reclaim.

Events
On 9 April 2022, Catania was excluded from the league with immediate effect due to financial issues, with only four games left for them to play till the end of the regular season; all of the club's results were subsequently expunged.

Group A (North)

Stadia and locations 
10 teams from Lombardy, 3 teams from Veneto, 2 teams from Emilia-Romagna, 2 teams from Piedmont, 2 teams from Trentino-Alto Adige/Südtirol and 1 team from Friuli Venezia Giulia.

Table

Group B (Centre)

Stadia and locations 
7 teams from Tuscany, 4 teams from Emilia-Romagna, 3 teams from Marche, 2 teams from Abruzzo, 1 team from Lazio, 1 team from Liguria, 1 team from Sardinia and 1 team from Umbria.

Table

Group C (South)

Stadia and locations 
6 teams from Apulia, 4 teams from Campania, 3 teams from Sicily, 2 teams from Basilicata, 2 teams from Calabria, 2 teams from Lazio and 1 team from Molise.

Table

Promotion play-offs 

As Padova and Südtirol, respectively winners and runners-up of the 2021–22 Coppa Italia Serie C, concluded the season in the first two spots from Group A, an additional spot in the national phase of the playoffs will be handed to the fourth-placed team from Group A itself.

Due to the exclusion of Catania, points for teams from Group C will be multiplied by a fixed coefficient of 1.05555556 in order to determine the best-placed team among different groups in the playoff rounds.

First round 
Matches were played on 1 May 2022.

{{OneLegResult|Ancona-Matelica||0–2|Olbia}}

|}

 Second round 
Matches were played on 4 May 2022.

|}

 Third round 
The first legs were played on 8 May 2022 and the second legs were played on 12 May 2022.

|}

 Quarter-finals 
The first legs were played on 17 May 2022 and the second legs were played on 20 and 21 May 2022.

|}

 Final Four 
The semi-finals legs were played on 25 and 29 May 2022 and the final legs were played on 5 and 12 June 2022.Palermo promoted to Serie B'''.

Relegation play-outs 

The first legs were played on 7 May 2022 and the second legs were played on 14 and 15 May 2022.

|}

Top goalscorers 

Note
1 Player scored 4 goals in the play-offs.
2 Player scored 2 goals in the play-offs.

Notes

References

External links
 Official website

Serie C seasons
3
Italy